Meyersville Independent School District is a public school district based in the community of Meyersville, Texas (USA).

Located in DeWitt County, a small portion of the district extends into Victoria County.

Meyersville ISD has one school - Meyersville Elementary - that serves students in grades kindergarten through eight. Ninth through twelfth grade students attend Cuero High School in the Cuero Independent School District.

In 2009, the school district was rated "exemplary" by the Texas Education Agency.

References

External links
 

School districts in DeWitt County, Texas
School districts in Victoria County, Texas